Ladonia is an unincorporated community and census-designated place (CDP) in Russell County, Alabama, United States. At the 2020 census, the population was 3,074. It is part of the Columbus, Georgia-Alabama, Metropolitan Statistical Area.

Geography
Ladonia is located at  (32.465666, -85.089046).

Demographics

As of the census of 2000, there were 3,229 people, 1,258 households, and 904 families living in the community. The racial makeup of the community was 91.82% White, 5.23% Black or African American, 0.65% Native American, 0.22% Asian, 0.31% from other races, and 1.77% from two or more races. 1.46% of the population were Hispanic or Latino of any race.

There were 1,258 households, out of which 34.2% had children under the age of 18 living with them, 56.4% were married couples living together, 10.2% had a female householder with no husband present, and 28.1% were non-families. 23.0% of all households were made up of individuals, and 7.8% had someone living alone who was 65 years of age or older. The average household size was 2.57 and the average family size was 3.02.

In the community, the population was spread out, with 25.8% under the age of 18, 9.1% from 18 to 24, 31.9% from 25 to 44, 23.0% from 45 to 64, and 10.2% who were 65 years of age or older. The median age was 35 years. For every 100 females, there were 101.2 males. For every 100 females age 18 and over, there were 99.9 males.

The median income for a household in the community was $34,214, and the median income for a family was $37,035. Males had a median income of $30,694 versus $20,227 for females. The per capita income for the community was $16,671. About 15.6% of families and 16.1% of the population were below the poverty line, including 20.2% of those under age 18 and 8.7% of those age 65 or over.

2010 census
As of the census of 2010, there were 3,142 people, 1,262 households, and 877 families living in the community. The racial makeup of the community was 86.5% White, 9.8% Black or African American, 0.7% Native American, 0.3% Asian, 1.2% from other races, and 1.5% from two or more races. 2.7% of the population were Hispanic or Latino of any race.

There were 1,262 households, out of which 28.3% had children under the age of 18 living with them, 44.3% were married couples living together, 17.9% had a female householder with no husband present, and 30.5% were non-families. 24.7% of all households were made up of individuals, and 8.2% had someone living alone who was 65 years of age or older. The average household size was 2.49 and the average family size was 2.91.

In the community, the population was spread out, with 23.7% under the age of 18, 8.8% from 18 to 24, 24.8% from 25 to 44, 30.1% from 45 to 64, and 12.7% who were 65 years of age or older. The median age was 39.3 years. For every 100 females, there were 99.2 males. For every 100 females age 18 and over, there were 97.8 males.

The median income for a household in the community was $36,333, and the median income for a family was $34,889. Males had a median income of $42,667 versus $27,075 for females. The per capita income for the community was $15,479. About 19.2% of families and 23.5% of the population were below the poverty line, including 19.2% of those under age 18 and 14.6% of those age 65 or over.

References

Unincorporated communities in Alabama
Census-designated places in Russell County, Alabama
Census-designated places in Alabama
Columbus metropolitan area, Georgia
Unincorporated communities in Russell County, Alabama